Mamakan (also Romanized as Mamakān) is a village in Sumay-ye Shomali Rural District of Sumay-ye Beradust District of Urmia County, West Azerbaijan province, Iran. At the 2006 National Census, its population was 1,457 in 245 households. The following census in 2011 counted 1,636 people in 393 households. The latest census in 2016 showed a population of 1,685 people in 398 households; it was the largest village in its rural district.

References 

Urmia County

Populated places in West Azerbaijan Province

Populated places in Urmia County